Famous Last Words (formerly known as A Walking Memory) is an American metalcore/post-hardcore band from Petoskey, Michigan. Formed in 2008, they're known for their concept albums and have released three studio albums to date: Two-Faced Charade, Council of the Dead and The Incubus. Following their 2016 release, "The Incubus," the group departed from Revival Recordings and signed to SBG Records.

The group currently consists of vocalist Jeremy "JT" Tollas, bassist Tyler Myklebust, guitarist Evan Foley, and drummer Cody Paige.

2008-2010: Barlait and A Walking Memory 
Hailing from Petoskey, Michigan, Famous Last Words (Then called Barlait) was formed in 2008 by member JT Tollas. The group released an album called A Walking Memory.

2010-2012: You Could Have Made This Easier, In Your Face, and Pick Your Poison 
Renaming themselves A Walking Memory, the group quickly began to make their mark within the scene. Utilizing heavy guitar riffs, catchy hooks, folly, and symphonic elements, the band took things a step further and introduced detailed stories into their lyrics and album structure; transforming their band into more of an art project. It was characteristics like this that lead the independent label InVogue Records to sign the band in 2012.

Aaron Peano would leave the band after the release of "In Your Face" in 2010. Starting his own band "The Monsters I've Met" 

They released the EP You Could Have Made This Easier in 2010. This appeared in self-initiative. After the name change this was followed by the EP's "In Your Face" in 2010 and Pick Your Poison in 2012. The latter has already appeared at InVogue Records.

2013: Two-Faced Charade 
Their first studio album, Two Faced Charade, released April 30, 2013. This is the first of their concept albums, a story about an outcast (who has schizophrenia), who falls in love with his neighbor, Elise (Welcome To The Show). Situations escalate, and he ends up following her into town (Victim of the Virtuoso), and finding out she has a boyfriend (The Relentless). He grows enraged, and starts to hear a screaming internally, one very similar to the one he feels inside. This scream is soon followed by a voice, the form that his previously mentioned schizophrenia takes (Voices). It starts telling him the actions he must take to have Elise as his (Lust of the Lost). He eventually makes a plan, when the boyfriend is about to go on a business trip, the main character stops him outside and acts concerned, since it seems as if the boyfriend was heavily drunk. He brings the boyfriend inside, and proceeds to murder the boyfriend (Legends and Legacies), and then hesitantly cut up the body, and then bury it into the ground (To Play Hide and Seek With Jealousy). Afterwards, he uses the boyfriend's phone to text Elise, in the perspective of the boyfriend telling her that they're done for, and that the stress of this job that the boyfriend took was too much. Elise gets heavily upset and the next day, when the main character goes over to her house to act like he was just coming to have breakfast, she rejects him kindly, explaining how they got broken up over text. The main character tells her everything is okay, and eventually that he took care of the boyfriend (Searching for a Home). She gets extremely confused when he says this, and once the main character realizes this, he runs back to his house, with Elise on his tail. She walks into the house, and into his bedroom, where the main character is (Even A Ghost Has A Sanctuary). She sees the bloodied knife and turns to the door, smelling the stench of blood and bleach. She walks into the bathroom and sees the blood, and the main character reassures her that he took care of her boyfriend, and that it's all okay. After she calls him a monster, he grows extremely angry and yells at her that he did this all of her and himself, before she says he did it all for him. He smashes her head into the wall vigorously, before realizing what he's doing and stopping himself. Realizing he just accidentally killed Elise, he turns to the mirror and tells the "inner-demon" that he had messed up his life, before the main character cuts himself down the wrist, killing himself. (The Show Must Go On, Prt. 1 and 2)
There's a short film  and a short story  both written by the lead singer, JT Tollas. He even directed the short film, and starred in it.

2014-2015: Council of the Dead

The band premiered the single "Council of the Dead" on January 27, 2014, and announced their second studio album, Council of the Dead, on the same day. The album is set to be released on August 26, 2014 through InVogue Records. On May 6, 2014 the band announced "The Hope Revolution Tour" beginning late August through September with fellow acts Hawthorne Heights, The Red Jumpsuit Apparatus and New Empire in the US.

On August 1, 2014, the band released the music video for two new tracks, "One In The Chamber" and "The End Of The Beginning", from their upcoming album Council of the Dead. Famous Last Words have revealed the artwork and track listing for their upcoming sophomore studio album, Council of the Dead was released on InVogue on August 26, 2014 nationwide.

On August 25, 2014, the band released Council of the Dead. It reached #91 on the Top 200 and #18 on Independent Albums on Billboard's charts. On October 10, the band announced "The InVogue Records Tour" beginning late November through December with fellow acts For All I Am, Kingdom of Giants and Whether, I in the US.

On February 19, 2015 the band announced "The Touring Dead" beginning late February through March with fellow acts For All I Am and Tear Out the Heart in the US.

2016-2018: Revival Recordings and The Incubus
On January 5, 2016, it was revealed by Revival Recordings that they had signed Famous Last Words, and that the band was working on their third studio album. The first single, "Pretty In Porcelain," as well as an acoustic rendition of "I'll Be Home Soon", from the label's upcoming compilation was released on iTunes, along with a promotional lyric video.

On June 10, 2016, the band announced "The Method to the Madness Tour" beginning late July with fellow acts Outline in Color, It Lives, It Breathes and Open Your Eyes in the US. On July 9, 2016 the first single, "Pretty In Porcelain", from their upcoming album was released on iTunes, along with a promotional music video.

On September 30, 2016, the group released their third effort, "The Incubus", marking their only release on Revival Recordings.

On November 10, 2016, the band announced "The Incubus Tour" beginning late November with fellow acts, The Funeral Portrait and Versus Me

On June 13, 2017, founding member and drummer Craig Simons announced his departure from the band, citing personal issues as his primary reasoning for his departure, and wishing his bandmates luck in the future.

On December 11, 2017, the band announced their departure from Revival Recordings, and wished all other bands on the label their best.

On October 26, 2018, the band released the first track "No Walls" off their new EP titled "Arizona".

2019-present: Arizona and The Negative
On May 16, 2019, the group released the extended play Arizona under SBG records, marking their first release under the label and their first non-concept effort. Commenting on the EP, Tollas stated: “Arizona is the result of us, as a band, living through and emerging from a really dark place. At the end of 2017, we weren’t sure what the future of Famous Last Words looked like. Or if there even was a future. We decided to channel all of that emotion and anger into the music you hear on this EP. The decision to abandon the concept format for this project was no accident. We had pain, anger, and emotion that we wanted our fans to understand were not anchored around a fictional character. These songs tell the stories of the things we were dealing with.”

On December 9, 2020, Tollas tweeted that he had finished "tracking the last bit of new FLW tracks" and that new music is coming soon.

Almost a full year later, on October 29, 2021, Famous Last Words finally released their new single "In The Blink Of An Eye", shocking many fans who had initially thought the band had disbanded. A little longer than a month after this, the band released their three track concept EP titled "The Negative", even though the band claimed to have departed from the concept theme. The EP, though only being three tracks long, (2 songs, and a four minute voice recording) tells the story of a photographer who sees “moments of truths” captured by his camera. He feels his purpose is to capture what he calls “moments of truth” which are completely unfiltered, unedited, natural moments. He wants to capture these moments and preserve them so people can remember what “real life” looks like among the plethora of inauthenticity. When developing one day he sees a vision of a parallel universe colliding with our universe in one of his photo negatives. He doesn’t know when or what is going to happen exactly once it collides, but he knows it’s going to be soon and he begins to wildly speculate on all of the horrifying possibilities. He carries this knowledge on his own out of fear of the world thinking he has gone mad.

Physical copies of the EP were limited to 300 copies, sold exclusively in their bundle titled The Anthology, including three CDs. CD one is their second EP, "Pick Your Poison", and "The Negative", CD two is their debut album "Two-Faced Charade", and CD three is their sophomore album "Council of the Dead". Alongside as the CD bundle, The Anthology included a flag, a poster, a "The Negative" t-shirt, and a single polaroid picture of one of the band members.

In August 2022, Famous Last Words embarked on their first tour in 3 years with support from Across The White Water Tower and Dark Divine.

Members 

Current
 Jeremy "JT" Tollas – lead vocals (2008–present)
 Evan Foley - guitars, backing vocals (2014–Present)
 Tyler Myklebust – bass (2018–present), guitar (2011–2018)
 Cody Paige — drums (2017–present)

Former

 Jesse Maddy – bass (2011–2013)
 Ethan Osborn – lead guitar, backing vocals (2010-2014), rhythm guitar (2010-2012)
 Craig Simons – drums, backing vocals (2010–2017)
 Matthew Bell – bass, backing vocals  (2010–2011)  (2013-2018)
 Aaron Peano – guitar, backing vocals (2008-2010)

Timeline

Discography

Studio albums 
 Two-Faced Charade (2013)
 Council of the Dead (2014)
 The Incubus (2016)

Extended plays 
 A Walking Memory (as Barlait) (2008)
 You Could Have Made This Easier (as A Walking Memory) (2010)
 In Your Face (as Famous Last Words) (2010)
 Pick Your Poison (2012)
 Arizona (2019)
 The Negative (2021)

Singles

Music videos

References

External links 
 

American post-hardcore musical groups
Musical groups established in 2010
Rock music groups from Michigan
2010 establishments in Michigan
Metalcore musical groups from Michigan